This is a list of the Estonia national football team results from 1991 to 2009.

Results

1991

1992

1993

1994

1995

1996

1997

1998

1999

2000

2001

2002

2003

2004

2005

2006

2007

2008

2009

See also
Estonia national football team results (1920–1940)
Estonia national football team results (2010–2019)
Estonia national football team results (2020–present)
Estonia national football team all-time record
List of Estonia international footballers

References

External links
 All matches of the Estonia national football team

 
football results